Harry Irving may refer to:

 Harry Irving (Canadian football) (1927–2006), Canadian football player
 Harry Irving (chemist) (1905–1993), British chemist
 Harry Brodribb Irving (1870–1919), British stage actor and actor-manager

See also
Henry Irving (disambiguation)